RFM Corporation is a publicly listed food and beverage company in the Philippines. RFM is a manufacturer of flour and flour-based products, milk, juice drinks, and ice cream. As of June 2013, RFM had an asset base of P12 billion and a total market capitalization of P17.1 billion.

History

Its founders included Salvador Z. Araneta, José N. Concepcion, Sr., B.J. Server, Albino Z. SyCip, Zoilo Alberto, Francisco D. Gamboa, Edward Miller Grimm, Leonardo Eugenio, David SyCip and Charles "Chick" Parsons. In 1973, RFM entered into an exclusive licensing agreement with Swift & Company to use the brand "Swift" for its meat processing business (in 1987, RFM purchased ownership rights for its exclusive use in the Philippines). For the next 15 years, RFM concentrated on growing its established core businesses and also introduced other grocery products, such as cake mixes, hotcake mixes, and ingredient mixes.

As it entered the 1990s, RFM began acquiring of a number of local companies and established partnerships with foreign companies.

In 1994, RFM divested its interest in hog operations and the poultry operations became known as Swift Foods Inc. (SFI). In 1995, RFM Properties and Holdings, Inc. was established to consolidate RFM's real estate assets as well as break into the property development business.

Between 1995 and 2000, RFM briefly ventured into noodle manufacturing, tuna processing, bakeshop business with the acquisition of the Rolling Pin trademark, food franchising (Little Caesars Pizza and Dairy Queen) and thrift banking (Consumer Bank).

In 1999, RFM formed a partnership with Unilever to produce and market its Selecta ice cream under the joint-venture company, Selecta Walls Inc., (now, Unilever-RFM Ice Cream Inc.).

In 2001, RFM sold its soft drink subsidiary Cosmos Bottling Corporation to Coca-Cola Bottlers Philippines, Inc. (now known as Coca-Cola Beverages Philippines, Inc.). Cosmos continued to be listed in the Philippine Stock Exchange until 2013.

In 2003, RFM spun off Swift Foods Inc., which formerly operated RFM's Swift poultry business, to become a separately owned company.

By the end of the first decade of the 2000s, RFM significantly reduced its holdings in Philtown Properties, Inc. after 66% of the outstanding shares were declared as property dividends in 2008 and 15% in 2009.

Recent developments

In November 2012, RFM sold its Swift processed meat business to the Pacific Meat Company, Inc. (PMCI), now known as Century Pacific Food, Inc. RFM said the transaction's total value could reach between P800 million and P850 million.

In January 2014, RFM acquired the Royal pasta brand from Unilever Philippines Inc. for $47.8 million (around P2.1 billion). The acquisition of the Royal pasta brand will allow the company to solidify its market leadership in the pasta category in the country. RFM's Fiesta brand is currently the top pasta brand in the Philippines, while the Royal brand is second.

Brands

Bulk flour:
 Republic Special
 Cinderella
 Altar Bread
 Milenyo
 Hi-Pro Majestic
 Señorita

Cake mixes:
 White King

Pasta:
 Fiesta
 Royal

Beverages:
 Sunkist juice

Refrigerated margarine:
 Butterfresh

Ice cream (Unilever-RFM Ice Cream Inc.):
 Selecta
 Selecta Cornetto
 Selecta Magnum

UHT Milk:
 Selecta
 Selecta Moo

Corporate social responsibility

RFM Foundation Inc. is the social development arm of the company. Among its notable projects are the Ten Outstanding Students of the Philippines and Project Pagsulong.

The Ten Outstanding Students of the Philippines seeks to honor students who made excellent academic performances and their contributions to society.

Project Pagsulong invites young Filipinos form a team and come up with innovative business ideas good enough to stand against proposals from other teams, as well as viable enough to provide real-life solutions for alleviating poverty.

See also
 Pop Cola Panthers

References

External links
RFM Corporation

Food and drink companies of the Philippines
Drink companies of the Philippines
Food and drink companies established in 1957
Companies listed on the Philippine Stock Exchange
Companies based in Mandaluyong
Condiment companies of the Philippines
Philippine companies established in 1957